Harald Svendsen (c. 996–998 − c. 1018) was King of Denmark (being Harald II) from 1014 until his death in c. 1018. He was the youngest son of Sweyn Forkbeard and Gunhild of Wenden, and was regent while his father was fighting Æthelred the Unready in England. He inherited the Danish throne in 1014, and held it while his brother, the later king Cnut the Great conquered England. After his death in 1018(?), he was succeeded by Cnut the Great. Little detail is known about Harald II.

References

1018 deaths
11th-century kings of Denmark
Year of birth unknown
11th-century Roman Catholics
Year of birth uncertain